Bernareggio is a comune (municipality) in the Province of Monza e Brianza in the Italian region Lombardy, located about  northeast of Milan.

Twin towns

 Wachtberg, Germany
 La Villedieu-du-Clain, France
 Michendorf, Germany

References

External links
 Official website

Populated places on Brianza